The River Hamble is located in south Hampshire, England. It rises near Bishop's Waltham and flows for  through Botley, Bursledon, and Lower Swanwick before entering Southampton Water between Hamble Common and Warsash.

The Hamble is tidal for about half its length and is navigable below Botley. From the medieval period to the present it has been a major ship and boat-building area. Leisure craft are still built by the Hamble today. One of the main builders was Luke & Co, later Luke Bros, a well-reputed yard from around 1890 to its closure in 1945. The lower reaches are a major yachting area with easy access to the sheltered waters of Southampton Water and The Solent.

Course 
From source to mouth the river makes a repeated curve heading south-southwest. It gains tributary streams before reaching Botley, the site of an ancient watermill. Below Botley, the river becomes tidal and navigable. It gains strength from adjoining streams, draining surrounding Hedge End, Curdridge, Shedfield, and Burridge.

This section was extensively used for medieval shipbuilding, using timber grown locally in the neighbouring woods. Nearby Kings Copse, a cut-back form of Kings Forest, speaks of this key use of the land.

The river's west bank can be accessed from Manor Farm Country Park, where it is possible to walk through Dock Copse and Fosters Copse. At extreme low tide, it is just possible to see the remains of the wreck of Henry V's 15th century warship Grace Dieu. This section of the river was also home to HMS Cricket, the Royal Marine landing craft crew training base, during World War II.

A passenger ferry crosses the river between Hamble-le-Rice and Warsash, forming a link for the Solent Way and E9 European Coastal Path. This section of the river is dominated by a number of marinas, the largest being the Port Hamble Marina, and boat yards on both banks as far upstream as Bursledon.  On the east bank, south of Warsash, is the Warsash Maritime School, part of Solent University, which provides training for merchant navy crew.

Lifeboat
The Hamble and nearby Solent are patrolled by Hamble Lifeboat, an independent voluntary rescue service.

Water quality
The Environment Agency measure water quality of the river systems in England. Each is given an overall ecological status, which may be one of five levels: high, good, moderate, poor and bad. There are several components that are used to determine this, including biological status, which looks at the quantity and varieties of invertebrates, angiosperms and fish. Chemical status, which compares the concentrations of various chemicals against known safe concentrations, is rated good or fail.

Water quality of the River Hamble in 2019:

In the 1970s and 80s the many yachts using the river polluted the water by leaching tributyltin from their anti-fouling paints. By 1988 it had the highest known level in the UK.

Gallery

See also
Rivers of the United Kingdom

References

External links

Walks in the Hamble Valley
 for the source of the River Hamble.
 for the mouth of the River Hamble.
The River Hamble Harbour Authority
Port Hamble Marina

Rivers of Hampshire
River navigations in the United Kingdom